The National Monuments of Zimbabwe are protected and promoted in accordance with the National Museums and Monuments Act 1972. This law replaced the colonial-era Monuments and Relics Act 1936, which in turn replaced the 1902 Ancient Monuments Protection Ordinance and 1912 Bushmen Relics Ordinance. The National Museums and Monuments of Zimbabwe (NMMZ) is the body responsible for maintaining the Archaeological Survey, the national inventory of monuments and sites. In April 2000 there were approximately 14,000 entries on the Archaeological Survey, of which 118 were National Monuments (including natural, cultural, and mixed sites). 79 National Monuments had been declared under the old system by 1954. By 1980, the register had grown to over 3,000 sites and 169 declared monuments.

National Monuments
The National Monuments register includes the following sites:

See also
 History of Zimbabwe
 Culture of Zimbabwe
 List of heritage registers

References

Zimbabwean culture
Heritage registers in Zimbabwe
Zimbabwe
1972 in India
Lists of tourist attractions in Zimbabwe